Qin Jinjing (born 27 September 1996) is a former Chinese badminton player who later played for Australia.

Career 
Qin Jinjing began to play badminton from the first grade of elementary school, when she was 10 years old. Her biggest achievement was in the 2013 Asian Youth Games, where she won the gold medal in the girls' singles event by beating Thailand's Busanan Ongbamrungphan in the final. She also clinched the bronze medal in the 2013 Asian Junior Championships, and the 2014 World Junior Championships. In March 2018, Qin Jinjing played in the Australian National Championships and won the women's singles and mixed doubles championships.

Achievements

BWF World Junior Championships 
Girls' singles

Asian Youth Games 
Girls' singles

Asian Junior Championships 
Girls' singles

BWF International Challenge/Series (1 runner-up) 
Women's singles

  BWF International Challenge tournament
  BWF International Series tournament
  BWF Future Series tournament

BWF Junior International (2 titles) 
Girls' singles

  BWF Junior International Grand Prix tournament
  BWF Junior International Challenge tournament
  BWF Junior International Series tournament
  BWF Junior Future Series tournament

References

External links 

Living people
1996 births
Sportspeople from Shenzhen
Badminton players from Guangdong
Chinese female badminton players
Chinese emigrants to Australia
Australian people of Chinese descent
Australian female badminton players